The 2017–18 Tunisian Ligue Professionnelle 1 (Tunisian Professional League) season was the 92nd season of top-tier football in Tunisia. The season calendar was drawn on July 24. The competition started on August 15.

Teams
A total of 14 teams contested the league, including 11 sides from the 2016–17 season and three promoted from the 2016–17 Ligue 2. US Monastir and Stade Tunisien obtained promotion after winning their penultimate game of the season, while CO Médenine won the promotion playoff against AS Marsa. The three teams replaced the five teams that were relegated to 2017–18 Tunisian Ligue 2 in order to reduce the number of teams from 16 to 14.

Stadiums and locations

Results

League table

Result table

Leaders

Top goalscorers

Updated to games played on 10 May 2018.

Relegation playoff
This game was played between the 12th of Ligue 1 and the 3rd of Ligue 2.

Match stopped after 62 minutes because EGS Gafsa players left the pitch as a protest against the referee who was "clearly against them" and declared that they "couldn't play a football match in such conditions".

See also
2017–18 Tunisian Ligue Professionnelle 2
2017–18 Tunisian Cup
2019 Tunisian Super Cup

References

External links
 2017–18 Ligue 1 on RSSSF.com
 Fédération Tunisienne de Football

Tunisian Ligue Professionnelle 1 seasons
Tunisia